Spilaio (Greek: Σπήλαιο meaning cave) is a village in the northern part of the Evros regional unit in Greece. It is in the municipal unit of Trigono. In 2011 its population was 334. It is in a relatively flat, agricultural area. The nearest larger villages are Dikaia to its north, and Plati to its southeast.

Population

History

The village was founded by the Ottoman Turks, it was known as İspitli then. After a brief period of Bulgarian rule between 1913 and 1919, it became part of Greece. As a result its Bulgarian and Turkish population was exchanged with Greek refugees, mainly from today's Turkey.

See also

List of settlements in the Evros regional unit

External links
Spilaio on GTP Travel Pages

References

Populated places in Evros (regional unit)